The Freedmen's Bureau bills provided legislative authorization for the Freedmen's Bureau (formally known as the Bureau of Refugees, Freedmen and Abandoned Lands), which was set up by U.S. President Abraham Lincoln in 1865 as part of the United States Army. Following the original bill in 1865, subsequent bills sought to extend its authority and lifespan. Andrew Johnson tried to derail the bill's intention to aid freed slaves, until the Bureau was disbanded on account of rampant corruption during the first term of U.S. President Ulysses S. Grant.

The various bills
The Freedmen's Bureau was created in 1865 during the Lincoln administration, by an act of Congress called the Freedman's Bureau Bill.  It was passed on March 3, 1865, in order to aid former slaves through food and housing, oversight, education, health care, and employment contracts with private landowners.

A follow-up Freedmen's Bureau Bill was vetoed by U.S. President Andrew Johnson on February 19, 1866, and Congress failed to override that veto on the following day.

That failed 1866 Freedmen's Bureau bill was closely related to the Civil Rights Act of 1866.  On March 9, 1866, Congressman John Bingham explained that, "the seventh and eighth sections of the Freedmen's Bureau bill enumerate the same rights and all the rights and privileges that are enumerated in the first section of this [the Civil Rights] bill."

On May 29, 1866, the House passed a further Freedmen's Bureau Bill, and on June 26, 1866, the Senate passed an amended version.  On July 3, 1866, both chambers passed a conference committee's compromise version.

On July 16, 1866, Congress received another presidential veto message, which Congress overrode later that day.  This congressional action extended the Freedmen's Bureau, increased antipathy between President Johnson and Radical Republicans in Congress, and was a major factor during Reconstruction.  The Freedmen's Bureau bill that passed in 1866 provided many additional rights to ex-slaves, including the distribution of land, schools for their children, and military courts to ensure these rights. The Freedmen's Bureau Act gave ex-slaves "any of the civil rights or immunities belonging to white persons, including the right to.....inherit, purchase, lease, sell, hold and convey real and personal property, and to have full and equal benefit of all laws and proceedings for the security of person and estate, including the constitutional right of bearing arms." This bill passed both House and Senate and they overrode the president's veto. This was in response to the Southern Black Codes & the KKK and other groups who were taking guns away from freedmen.

In July 1868, Congress voted to again extend the Freedmen's Bureau, but a couple weeks later decided to limit its functions to processing claims and supporting education.  Four years later, in June 1872, Congress voted to completely shut down the Freedmen's Bureau by the end of that month.

See also
Slave Trade Acts

References
 McKitrick, Eric L. Andrew Johnson and Reconstruction (1960)
Foner, Eric "The Making of Radical Reconstruction"

Footnotes

Freedmen's Bureau
Reconstruction Era legislation